Mullins Valley is a four mile long valley located at 5,400 ft elevation in the McMurdo Dry Valleys. It is one of the few dry valleys in the world to contain rock glaciers. US Antarctic Program (USAP) research has dated the subsurface ice in Mullins Valley at 4 million years old making it among the oldest ice on earth. United States Antarctic Program (USAP) research has also shown the rock glaciers in the valley to be analogous to the Arsia Mons region on Mars. Named for Jerry L. Mullins, Physical Scientist, Director, Polar Programs, Antarctic and Arctic Program for United States Geological Survey (USGS), National Science Foundation Antarctic geophysical research, and U.S Scientific Committee (SCAR) delegate to SCAR SCAGI committee. Appointed by the National Academy of Sciences, Polar Research Board. His was responsible for Antarctic field research in the Transantarctic Mountains, McMurdo Dry Valleys, Shackleton Mountains, Beardmore Mountains, Antarctic Peninsula, Mount Siple, Amundsen-Scott South Pole station and at deep field research locations in West Antarctica. His program conducted research in the disciplines of global positioning systems, geodesy, crustal motion, glacial geophysics, airborne geospatial systems, airborne geophysics, seismology, light radar (lidar), topographic mapping and he managed the USGS South Pole winter-over program from 1989 to 1994. He was appointed by the National Academy of Sciences, Polar Research Board as a US delegate to the Scientific Committee on Antarctic Research Geosciences Standing Scientific Group from 1995–July 2012 and was appointed as a member of the Advisory Committee on Antarctic Names in 1994. Mullins Valley appears in the Antarctic research literature, on the maps from the British expedition of Captain Scott and in aerial photographs from the United States expedition Operation Highjump by Admiral Byrd. Mullins Valley, Mullins Lake, Mullins Glacier, and Mullins Geodetic Station, Antarctica are named for United States polar explorer and researcher Jerry L. Mullins.

Valleys of Victoria Land
McMurdo Dry Valleys